The CAMM (Common Anti-Air Modular Missile) is a family of surface-to-air missiles developed by MBDA UK for the United Kingdom. CAMM shares some common features and components with the ASRAAM air-to-air missile, but with updated electronics and an active radar homing seeker.

As Sea Ceptor, CAMM is replacing the Sea Wolf missile on Type 23 frigates of the Royal Navy since 2018. As Land Ceptor, it is the missile part of the Sky Sabre air defence system, which since 2021 has been replacing the Rapier missile in British Army service. The system is also contributing to the updating of MBDA's ASRAAM in service with the Royal Air Force.

Development
The Common Anti-Air Modular Missile has its roots in a Technology Demonstration Programme (TDP), jointly funded by MBDA and the Ministry of Defence (MoD) as part of the United Kingdom's Future Local Area Air Defence System (FLAADS). FLAADS is part of a wider UK 'Team Complex Weapons' programme to deliver a variety of weapons and maintain UK sovereign capability in this area. FLAADS is intended to deliver a common weapons platform, the Common Anti-Air Modular Missile (CAMM), to equip forces in the air, land and maritime environments. During the early stages of the FLAADS programme, requirements were identified for the new missile to meet both current and anticipated threats, namely "airborne targets which are typified by high speed, rapid evasive manoeuvres, low signatures and advanced countermeasure[s]."

Phase 1 of the TDP worked on technologies for soft vertical launch, the low-cost active radar seeker, a dual-band two-way datalink and a programmable open systems architecture. Phase 2 began in 2008 and covered the manufacture of flight-worthy subsystems, mid-course guidance firings and captive airborne seeker trials on a Qinetiq Andover experimental aircraft. The Soft Vertical Launch was proven over a series of trials, culminating in a successful truck launch in May 2011. In January 2012 the MoD awarded MBDA a £483 million contract to develop FLAADS (Maritime) to replace Sea Wolf missiles on Type 23 frigates.

Milestones
 In January 2012, MBDA and the Ministry of Defence announced a contract worth £483 million to fully develop the maritime application of CAMM known as Sea Ceptor for the Royal Navy.
 In August 2014, the Chilean Navy emerged as a potential export customer for CAMM to equip their Type 23 frigates.
 In November 2014, the Brazilian Navy selected CAMM to equip their future Tamandaré-class frigates.
 In January 2015, the Ministry of Defence announced that it had signed a development and manufacturing deal with MBDA in late December 2014.
 In May 2016, the Spanish Navy selected CAMM-ER to equip their future F110-class frigates. Later in 2018 the missile lost against RIM-162 Evolved SeaSparrow Missile Block II
 In September 2017, the first Sea Ceptor missile was successfully fired at sea from the Type 23 frigate, HMS Argyll.
 In July 2021 it was reported that Sky Sabre had started acceptance trials and training with the Royal Artillery. It was planned to deploy the system in the Falkland Islands in "late summer/early autumn".
 In March 2022 the Secretary of State for Defence announced that Sky Sabre would be deployed to Poland, in response to concerns of further aggression from Russia following the invasion of Ukraine.

Operational history

United Kingdom
Sea Ceptor entered operational service with the Royal Navy in May 2018, with  being the first Type 23 frigate to deploy with the system.

Land Ceptor was delivered to the British Army as part of the Sky Sabre air defence system in December 2021, before being declared operational in January 2022. During the same month, its first deployment was announced to the Falkland Islands to replace the existing Rapier missile batteries. In March 2022, the UK announced it would be deploying the Sky Sabre missile system to Poland to bolster NATO's Eastern flank following the 2022 Russian invasion of Ukraine.

Characteristics
CAMM is a point defence and local area defence missile designed to respond to sophisticated missile and aircraft attacks.[7] MBDA states that CAMM has a "high rate of fire against multiple simultaneous targets",[23] providing capabilities comparable to the Aster 15 missile.

Development costs were reduced by a using modular design and minimised complexity. Additionally, the command and control software reuses over 75% of that developed for the PAAMS system.[11]

CAMM has a minimum operational range of less than 1 km and a maximum range greater than 25 km, although IHS Jane's reports that trials have a shown a capability of up to 60 km.

CAMM's claimed benefits include:
 Active RF seeker that means there is no need for complex and high-cost fire control/illumination radars
 A two-way datalink.
 A Soft Vertical Launch (SVL) system that offers 360° degree coverage. This uses a gas generator to eject the missile from its canister, the benefits of which include increased range – by saving all the rocket motor's energy to power the intercept – reduced minimum intercept range, reduced stress on launch platforms, reduced maintenance costs, more compact installations on ships and there being no need to manage the hot gas efflux on board, reduced launch signature, and on land the possibility of firing the missile from wooded or urban areas.
 CAMM comes in its own launch canisters, or alternately can be quad-packed into existing vertical launching systems.

CAMM's Extended Range application is known as CAMM-ER and has been under development with MBDA and Avio for the Italian MoD since 2013.[26] The CAMM-ER (extended range variant) shares the same characteristics of the original CAMM with the exception of a new Avio rocket engine which significantly increases the missile's engagement range, out to 45 km and a slightly adapted missile structure.

Applications

Sea 
The maritime application of CAMM is known as Sea Ceptor.

MBDA claims that CAMM has a "wide target set", including the capability to engage small naval vessels, which would give the missile a limited surface-to-surface role. The Anti-Air-Warfare Officer of the Type 23 Frigate HMS Westminster said after test firings “Westminster managed to explore the real potential of the system during her training and to say it is a real game changer is an understatement. Unlike its predecessor, the system is capable of defending ships other than Westminster herself. Whether it’s engaging multiple air threats or fast incoming attack craft, Sea Ceptor represents a massive capability upgrade for the Type 23 frigate.”

The maritime application of CAMM-ER is known as Albatros NG.

Land 

On land, CAMM is known as Land Ceptor by the British Army and the whole land-based air defence system is known as Sky Sabre. Deliveries to the Royal Artillery began in December 2021.

The system has over three times the range of its predecessor Rapier. This system consists of Land Ceptor missiles, SAAB Giraffe AMB radars and Rafael Advanced Defense Systems Modular Integrated C4I Air & Missile Defense System (MIC4AD), all mounted on MAN trucks.

For international customers, MBDA markets the 'Enhanced Modular Air Defence Solutions (EMADS).

Air
Originally, the CAMM program aspired to provide Land, Sea and Air launched capabilities, but it was deemed more effective to instead develop CAMM for use for land and sea only, while using the well established ASRAAM short range air-to-air missile to cover the air launched role. However, technologies and components developed for CAMM have been used as part of an upgrade to ASRAAM.

Gallery

Operators

Current operators

 Chilean Navy - Replaced Sea Wolf on the current Type 23 frigates 

 Royal New Zealand Navy -  frigate upgrade.

 Royal Navy - Sea Ceptor was officially declared "in service" with the Royal Navy in May 2018, and the Type 23 frigate fleet is being upgraded from Sea Wolf. Sea Ceptor will also equip the Type 26 frigates, Type 31 frigates and Type 45 destroyers.
 British Army - Sky Sabre began entering service with the Royal Artillery in January 2022, replacing Rapier.

 Polish Armed Forces - CAMM was selected as part of Poland's Narew ground-based air defence system in November 2021. In April 2022, Poland bought two CAMM system fire units (1 battery) as a bridge solution until the target version for the Narew program was developed. The set includes a total of 6 iLaunchers (3 per fire unit), 2 ZDPSR Soła radars, Polish command system and transport vehicles, and a supply of missiles. 
 On the 4th of October the first fully operational unit anti-aircraft system called "Little Narew" utilizing the CAMM family missiles was handed over to the soldiers of the 18th Anti-Aircraft Regiment in Zamość

Future operators

 Brazilian Navy - CAMM selected to equip the new Tamandaré class frigates.
 Brazilian Marine Corps: AV-MMA, a CAMM variant, will equip an anti-aircraft version of the Astros II MLRS.

 Royal Canadian Navy - CAMM was selected to equip the Canadian Surface Combatant as a Close-In Air Defence System (CIADS).

 Pakistan Navy has selected CAMM-ER to equip its new MILGEM corvettes.

 Italian Army - CAMM-ER selected to replace Skyguard (Aspide missiles) batteries with PCMI/X-TAR 3D
 Italian Air Force - CAMM-ER selected to replace SPADA (Aspide missiles) batteries with MAADS/Kronos LND
 Italian Navy - CAMM-ER to replace Aster 15 missiles.

 Polish Navy - CAMM was selected as Poland's Miecznik class frigate (Type 31 frigate) air defence system in March 2022 

 Royal Saudi Navy - CAMM was selected to equip the Multi-Mission Surface Combant (MMSC)

See also

 Anti-aircraft warfare
 List of missiles
 Hisar
 RIM-162 ESSM
 Barak 8
 VL MICA
 Umkhonto (missile)
 VL-SRSAM

References

External links
 CAMM (MARITIME APPLICATION)
 New Missile system to shield the fleet from air attack Royal Navy (31 January 2012)
 CAMM Common Anti-Air Modular Missile air defense system on armyrecognition.com
 CAMM-ER (MBDA Systems)

Air-to-air missiles of the United Kingdom
United Kingdom defence procurement
Naval surface-to-air missiles
Post–Cold War missiles of the United Kingdom
Surface-to-air missiles of the United Kingdom
21st-century surface-to-air missiles
Military equipment introduced in the 2010s